Jarmundi Assembly constituency   is an assembly constituency in  the Indian state of Jharkhand.

Overview
Jarmundi Assembly constituency covers: Jarmundi Police Station in Dumka district and Sarawan Police Station in Deoghar district.

Jarmundi Assembly constituency is part of Godda (Lok Sabha constituency).

Members of Legislative Assembly 
2005: Hari Narayan Ray, Independent candidate.
2009: Hari Narayan Ray, Independent candidate
2014: Badal Patralekh, Indian National Congress
2019: Badal Patralekh, Indian National Congress

Election Results

2019

See also
Jarmundi
Sarwan
List of states of India by type of legislature

References

Assembly constituencies of Jharkhand